Orion Football Club was a Scottish football team who played in the city of Aberdeen between 1885 and 1903.

History

The club's first known match was a 2-0 defeat to Bon Accord F.C., in which the Orion club was said to have been "very good for a new club".

Orion won two Northern League championships, in 1897 and 1899.  The club also won the Rhodesia Cup in 1898–99 (contested between the three senior Aberdeen clubs: Aberdeen, Orion and Victoria United).

Orion was one of the three clubs who merged on 14 April 1903 to form the current Aberdeen F.C.; the other two being Aberdeen and Victoria United.

Playing colours
The club's colours were:

 Claret Shirt
 Dark Blue Shorts
 Dark Blue Socks

Grounds

The club's first match was at the Recreation Grounds in Aberdeen, moving to Cattofield by 1893.

Scottish Cup Record

1886–87

1887–88

1889–90

1890–91

1893–94

1894–95

1896–97

1897–98

1898–99

1899–1900

1900–01

1902–03

Honours 

 Northern League
 1896–97, 1898–99

 Aberdeenshire Cup
 1890–91, 1894–95, 1896–97, 1898–99, 1900–01

 Aberdeenshire Charity Cup
 1893–94,1895–96, 1897–98

 Aberdeen Charity Cup
 1888–89, 1890–91

 Gershon Cup
 1893–94, 1894–95, 1896–97

 Rhodesia Cup
 1898–99, 1901–02

ADFA Hospital Tournament
 1887–88

References

Aberdeen F.C.
Defunct football clubs in Scotland
Association football clubs established in 1885
Association football clubs disestablished in 1903
Football clubs in Aberdeen
1885 establishments in Scotland
1903 disestablishments in Scotland